William Armitage may refer to:

 William Edmond Armitage (1830–1873), bishop of the Episcopal Church
 William James Armitage (1860–1929), Anglican minister in Canada
 Ramsay Armitage (William Robert Ramsay Armitage, 1889–1984), Canadian Anglican priest
 Kenneth Armitage (William Kenneth Armitage, 1916–2002), British sculptor